The Fatal Hour is a 1908 American silent short crime film directed by D. W. Griffith.

Cast
 George Gebhardt as Hendricks
 Harry Solter as Pong Lee
 Linda Arvidson as Kidnapped Woman
 Florence Auer
 Charles Gorman
 D. W. Griffith as Policeman
 Marion Leonard
 Jeanie MacPherson
 Anthony O'Sullivan as Chinese Driver
 Mack Sennett as Policeman

References

External links
 

1908 films
1900s crime films
American crime films
American silent short films
American black-and-white films
Films directed by D. W. Griffith
Films shot in Fort Lee, New Jersey
1900s American films